Serenade is a ballet by George Balanchine to Tchaikovsky's  1880 Serenade for Strings in C, Op. 48. Serenade is credited as being George Balanchine's first full-length ballet in America. Using the students of his newly formed School of American Ballet, Balanchine choreographed this ballet for an American audience that had not been widely exposed to ballet before. Students of the School of American Ballet gave the first performance on Sunday, 10 June 1934 on the Felix M. Warburg estate in White Plains, N.Y., where Mozartiana had been danced the previous day.
It was then presented by the Producing Company of the School of American Ballet on 6 December at the Avery Memorial Theatre of the Wadsworth Atheneum with sets by the painter William Littlefield. Balanchine presented the ballet as his response to the generous sponsorships he received during his immigration to America.  The official premiere took place on 1 March 1935 with the American Ballet at the Adelphi Theatre, New York, conducted by Sandor Harmati.

NYCB principal dancer Philip Neal chose to include Serenade in his farewell performance on Sunday, 13 June 2010.

The blue tutus used in Serenade inspired the naming of the Balanchine crater on the planet Mercury.

Analysis

The work can be considered a bridge between his two early works for Sergei Diaghilev and his later, less episodic American works. The dance is characterized by two falls, a choreographic allusion to Giselle, but also an element in the Khorumi, a Georgian folk dance which influenced Balanchine.
While Serenade is one of Balanchine's infamous plotless ballets, many elements of the dance seem to point towards a loose form of a story. As dancers came and went during the rehearsal process, Balanchine choreographed their entrances and exits into the piece. At the beginning of rehearsals, Balanchine started with seventeen young women, reflected in the opening scene of the ballet. The next rehearsal there were only nine women present and then six, so he choreographed the following scenes with those numbers of dancers. Male students began to attend the rehearsals and so they were choreographed in, and the late arrival of one woman was also included. While plotless, Serenade reflected the ups and downs of choreographing a ballet, and made the humanity of the dancers clear when he choreographed their real-life mistakes into the finished product.

By achieving this, Balanchine made the ballet very student-friendly: according to City Ballet's Robert Gottlieb, the ballet was formed in such a way “in order to have something to teach the students with—something they could handle yet would stretch their abilities,”. The rehearsal process was extensive - according to some sources the students underwent as long as six months of rehearsal before their first performance in 1934  - and included levels of increasingly difficult technique as the ballet went on. Starting with a simple gesture phrase, the ballet then explores everything from complex formations to technical elements of partnering in the “Waltzing Girl”, for example. Thus, the ballet acted as an important teaching tool that students of all advanced levels could potentially participate in and work up to as a graduation exercise.

Choreographed to a sweeping Tchaikovsky score and with nods to traditional ballets such as Giselle and Swan Lake, Balanchine also created an atmosphere of yearning and romanticism, aided by the soft blue tutus of the women and dimmed lighting,.

While the piece was first choreographed with students in mind, the American Ballet Theatre is the first ballet company credited with performing it. Starting in 1935 the company performed Serenade, first for two weeks in New York City and then moving on with a fourteen-week tour of the United States. While their early performances were not highly successful, many interpreted this “lack of enthusiasm as an indication of the company’s immaturity,”  and ballet's general premature introduction to the United States.

Original cast
   
Leda Anchutina
Holly Howard
Elise Reiman
Elena de Rivas
Sylvia Giselle (Gisella Caccialanza)
Helen Leitch
Annabelle Lyon
Kathryn Mullowny
Heidi Vosseler
Ruthanna Boris
 
Charles Laskey

References

General references 

 
Playbill, NYCB, Friday, February 22, 2008

Repertory Week, NYCB, Winter season, 2008 repertory, week 7

Articles 

  
Sunday NY Times, June 10, 1934
NY Times, June 11, 1934
NY Times, February 10, 1936
Sunday NY Times by John Martin, July 27, 1941
 
NY Times by John Martin, June 24, 1942
Sunday NY Times by Anna Kisselgoff, September 25, 1983
NY Times by Roberta Heshenson April 11, 2004

Obituaries 
NY Times of Marie-Jeanne by Jack Anderson, January 3, 2008

Reviews 

  
NY Times by John Martin, October 18, 1940
NY Times by John Martin, December 21, 1956
 
NY Times by John Martin, August 29, 1959
 Ballet Magazine, by Eric Taub, February–March 2004
NY Times by Jennifer Dunning, February 18, 2008

External links 

 Serenade on the website of the Balanchine Trust

Ballets by George Balanchine
Ballets to the music of Pyotr Ilyich Tchaikovsky
New York City Ballet repertory
1934 ballet premieres